Anthony Charteau (born 4 June 1979 in Nantes) is a French former professional road bicycle racer, who competed as a professional between 2001 and 2013. His biggest career victory was winning the Mountains classification in the Tour de France in the 2010 edition, which was his major breakthrough. He also won the Tropicale Amissa Bongo stage race in Gabon for three years in a row from 2010 to 2012.

Charteau retired at the end of the 2013 season, after thirteen seasons as a professional.

Major results

2003
 2nd Classic Loire Atlantique
 4th Tour du Doubs
2004
 6th Overall Route du Sud
2005
 1st Stage 6 Volta a Catalunya
 4th Tour du Finistère
 9th International Grand Prix Doha
2006
 1st Polynormande
 2nd Grand Prix de Plumelec-Morbihan
2007
 1st  Overall Tour de Langkawi
1st Stage 3
 2nd Paris–Camembert
 3rd Overall Tour du Limousin
 4th Trophée des Grimpeurs
 9th Tour du Finistère
2008
 3rd Paris–Bourges
2010
 1st  Overall La Tropicale Amissa Bongo
1st Stage 4
 1st  Mountains classification, Tour de France
 9th Tour du Finistère
2011
 1st  Overall La Tropicale Amissa Bongo
 3rd Boucles de l'Aulne
 6th Tour de Vendée
 10th Overall Route du Sud
1st Stage 2
2012
 1st  Overall La Tropicale Amissa Bongo
 3rd Overall Route du Sud
 7th Paris–Camembert
2013
 1st Stage 4 Tour de Normandie
 9th Overall Rhône-Alpes Isère Tour

Notes

External links

Europcar Profile

1979 births
Living people
French male cyclists
Cyclists from Nantes